Frances Anne Spencer-Churchill, Duchess of Marlborough, VA (15 April 1822 – 16 April 1899) was an English noblewoman, the wife of British peer and statesman John Spencer-Churchill, 7th Duke of Marlborough. One of her sons, Lord Randolph Churchill, was the father of Prime Minister Sir Winston Churchill. She had a total of 11 children, and her principal home was the monumental Blenheim Palace, which she rejuvenated with her "lavish and exciting entertainments", and transformed into a "social and political focus for the life of the nation". She was invested as a Lady of the Royal Order of Victoria and Albert for her efforts at famine relief in Ireland.

Family
Lady Frances Anne Emily Vane was born on 15 April 1822 at the Duke of St Albans's house in St James's Square, London, the eldest daughter of Irish-born Charles Vane, 3rd Marquess of Londonderry, and heiress Lady Frances Anne Vane-Tempest. At her baptism, Arthur Wellesley, 1st Duke of Wellington stood as her godfather. She had three brothers, including George Vane-Tempest, 5th Marquess of Londonderry, and two younger sisters. She had an older half-brother, Frederick Stewart, 4th Marquess of Londonderry, by her father's first marriage to Lady Catherine Bligh.

Marriage and issue
On 12 July 1843 at St. George Street, Mayfair, Lady Frances married John Spencer-Churchill, Marquess of Blandford. Upon her marriage she was styled Marchioness of Blandford. The couple made their principal home at the Spencer-Churchill family seat of Blenheim Palace in Woodstock, Oxfordshire.

The marriage produced eleven children:
 George Charles Spencer-Churchill, 8th Duke of Marlborough (13 May 1844 – 9 November 1892)
 Lord Frederick John Winston Spencer-Churchill (2 February 1846 – 5 August 1850)
 Lady Cornelia Henrietta Maria Spencer-Churchill (17 September 1847 – Upper Brook Street, Mayfair, London, 22 January 1927), married 25 May 1868 Ivor Bertie Guest, 1st Baron Wimborne, by whom she had issue.
 Lady Rosamund Jane Frances Spencer-Churchill (9 November 1851 - 3 December 1920), married 12 July 1877 William Fellowes, 2nd Baron de Ramsey, by whom she had issue
 Lord Randolph Henry Spencer-Churchill (13 February 1849 – 24 January 1895), married 15 April 1874 Jennie Jerome, father of Sir Winston Churchill and John Strange Spencer-Churchill.
 Lady Fanny Octavia Louise Spencer-Churchill (29 January 1853 – 5 August 1904), married 9 June 1873 Edward Marjoribanks, 2nd Baron Tweedmouth, by whom she had issue.
 Lady Anne Emily Spencer-Churchill (Lower Brook Street, Mayfair, London, 14 November 1854 – South Audley Street, Mayfair, London, 20 June 1923), married 11 June 1874 James Innes-Ker, 7th Duke of Roxburghe, by whom she had issue.
 Lord Charles Ashley Spencer-Churchill (25 November 1856 – 11 March 1858)
 Lord Augustus Robert Spencer-Churchill (4 July 1858 – 12 May 1859)
 Lady Georgiana Elizabeth Spencer-Churchill (10 St James's Square, St James's, London, 14 May 1860 – 9 February 1906), married 4 June 1883 Richard George Penn Curzon, 4th Earl Howe, by whom she had issue.
 Lady Sarah Isabella Augusta Spencer-Churchill (4 July 1865 – 22 October 1929), a war correspondent during the Boer War; married 21 November 1891 Lt. Col. Gordon Chesney Wilson (son of Sir Samuel Wilson, MP)

Duchess of Marlborough
On 1 July 1857, her husband succeeded to the title of 7th Duke of Marlborough, and from that date henceforth, Frances was styled Duchess of Marlborough. She was a commanding and hot-tempered woman described in The Complete Peerage as a "woman of remarkable character and capacity, judicious and tactful". Her face had more strength than beauty and her eyes were either warm or hard, never lacklustre.

She ruled Blenheim Palace and its household with an iron hand; yet it was she who rejuvenated the palace with her lavish and gay entertainments which she herself organised; transforming the palace "into a social and political focus for the life of the nation".

She was a domineering yet devoted mother; both of her surviving sons' marriages were a disappointment to her. Her eldest son George married a woman described as stupid, pious and dull, while her youngest and favourite son, Lord Randolph earned her displeasure by marrying, against the wishes of both herself and the Duke, American socialite Jennie Jerome, whom Frances openly disliked.

Frances and her husband refused to attend Lord Randolph and Jennie's wedding at the British Embassy in Paris, which took place on Frances's 52nd birthday. Like the rest of the 19th-century British aristocracy, the Marlboroughs regarded American women as "strange and abnormal creatures with habits and manners something between a Red Indian and a Gaiety Girl". When the newly-wed couple moved to their home in Curzon Street in London, however, Frances arrived to help Jennie pay her first visits to the leaders of London society. She lent her some of her own jewels for the occasion, and the two women travelled in the Marlborough family coach. Frances featured largely in the lives of the younger members of the family, including her grandson Winston, to whom she often acted as a substitute mother.

From 1876 to 1880 her husband served as Lord Lieutenant of Ireland. As the result of her diligent efforts at famine relief in which she displayed humanity, proficiency and leadership that attempted to avert the effects of the 1879 Great Famine, she was invested as a Lady of the Order of Victoria and Albert by Queen Victoria.

Last years
She became a widow in 1883, lost her eldest son, George, in 1892, and on 24 January 1895, her only surviving son, Lord Randolph Churchill, died at her London home in Grosvenor Square. She never stopped mourning Randolph, and harboured much resentment against his wife, whom she had never liked and now criticised for behaviour unbecoming a grieving widow.

Death
Frances died at Blenheim on 16 April 1899, the day after her 77th birthday, having outlived five of her eleven children. She was buried on 21 April 1899 in the family vault beneath Blenheim Chapel. Her grandson Sir Winston Churchill wrote of her: "She was a woman of exceptional capacity, energy and decision".

Portrayals in film and television
The Duchess was portrayed by Rachel Kempson in the 1974 Thames TV mini-series Jennie: Lady Randolph Churchill.

Ancestry

References

Sources
Martin, Ralph G. Jennie: The Life of Lady Randolph Churchill, Volume One, The Romantic Years (1854–1895), New American Library, New York, 1969;

1822 births
1899 deaths
English duchesses by marriage
Daughters of British marquesses
Frances
Ladies of the Royal Order of Victoria and Albert
Frances
People from Westminster
Wives of knights